USS Floyds Bay (AVP-40) was a United States Navy Barnegat-class small seaplane tender in commission from 1945 to 1960 that saw service in World War II and the Korean War.

Construction and commissioning

Floyds Bay (AVP-40) was laid down at Lake Washington Shipyard at Houghton, Washington. She was launched on 28 January 1945, sponsored by Mrs. R. R. McCracken, and commissioned on 25 March 1945.

World War II operations 1945 

After training at Pearl Harbor, Hawaii, and in the Mariana Islands, Floyds Bay arrived at Okinawa on 28 July 1945 to operate with Air-Sea Rescue Squadron 6 and other seaplanes. She was on these duties when World War II ended with the cessation of hostilities with Japan on 15 August 1945.

Honors and awards

Floyds Bay received one battle star for her World War II service.

Peacetime operations 1945–1950 

Floyds Bay continued her duties at Okinawa until 9 September 1945. From that time, she controlled seadromes at Wakanoura Wan and Nagoya in Japan and at Shanghai and Tsingtao, China. She concluded her post-World War II occupation duties when she departed Yokohama, Japan, on 1 December 1946 bound for San Francisco, California.

From her home port, San Diego, California, Floyds Bay sailed on a round-the-world good-will cruise between 6 June 1947 and 27 March 1948. Proceeding eastward, she called at Mediterranean and Far Eastern ports, operating in Japanese waters for several months.

In the summer of 1948, Floyds Bay served as tender for seaplanes flying photographic missions from Annette Island, Alaska. During the summer of 1949, she carried out important assignments at Hong Kong, when she served as communications base for diplomatic officials, and maintained a seadrome for the evacuation of Americans from Communist-threatened Canton, China, during the Chinese Civil War.

Korean War 1950–1953 and peacetime operations 1953–1959 

Annually from 1950 through 1959, Floyds Bay had tours of duty in the Far East. She served as a seaplane tender at Iwakuni, Japan, during the Korean War (1950–1953), and often as station ship at Hong Kong. With these cruises she alternated duty on the United States West Coast, which took her from Mexico to Alaska.

Honors and awards

Floyds Bay received one battle star for her Korean War service.

Decommissioning and disposal 

On 26 February 1960, Floyds Bay was decommissioned and placed in reserve at Puget Sound Naval Shipyard at Bremerton, Washington. She was stricken from the Naval Vessel Register on 1 March 1960 and sold on 20 July 1960.

References 
 
 Department of the Navy Naval Historical Center Online Library of Selected Images: U.S. Navy Ships: USS Floyds Bay (AVP-40), 1945–1960
 NavSource Online: Service Ship Photo Archive AVP-40 Floyds Bay
 Chesneau, Roger. Conways All the World's Fighting Ships 1922–1946. New York: Mayflower Books, Inc., 1980. .

External links
 Dictionary of American Naval Fighting Ships 
 

World War II auxiliary ships of the United States
Cold War auxiliary ships of the United States
Korean War auxiliary ships of the United States
Barnegat-class seaplane tenders
1945 ships
Ships built at Lake Washington Shipyard